Astro Lounge is the second studio album by American rock band Smash Mouth, released on June 8, 1999, by Interscope Records.

It includes the single "All Star", arguably the group's most well-known song, which nearly topped the US Billboard Hot 100. Three other singles were released from the album, namely "Waste", "Then the Morning Comes", and a cover of "Can't Get Enough of You Baby".

Song information

"All Star"
"All Star" was featured in the 1999 films Mystery Men and Inspector Gadget, the 2000 film Digimon: The Movie, and the 2001 films Shrek and Rat Race. It was also nominated for a Grammy Award for Best Pop Performance by a Duo or Group with Vocals.

"Then the Morning Comes"
"Then the Morning Comes" was used in a TV commercial by Nissan. It was Smash Mouth's first single to enter the Billboard charts, reaching number eleven, though it was somewhat eclipsed by the success of "All Star" from the same album.

"Can't Get Enough of You Baby"
Smash Mouth recorded a cover of "Can't Get Enough of You Baby" in 1998 for inclusion in the film Can't Hardly Wait. Their version is reminiscent of Question Mark and the Mysterians 1967 cover version (as well as Question Mark and the Mysterians' 1967 hit, "96 Tears"). It was also released as a single in 1998, and later appeared on Astro Lounge. It was the last song on the album and also the shortest (by one second).

The song was first recorded by The Four Seasons and then The Toys, both in 1966 (though neither band released the song as a single). It was also recorded by The Colourfield in 1985.

In early 2007, Pizza Hut aired a series of commercials featuring "Can't Get Enough of You Baby" in the background.

TNT Networks also used this track for a montage of "classic" movies to be shown, including Pretty Woman.

"Diggin' Your Scene"
"Diggin' Your Scene" was used in episode 17 of the first season of the television show Alias. Thirty minutes into the flashback episode "Q & A", the song plays over a montage of the protagonist Sydney Bristow performing a series of action stunts and costume changes (while the lyric "every day a new disguise, every night a Halloween" is sung).

"Road Man"
Afternoon drive personality Kenny Roda uses "Road Man" as a bumper for his radio show, heard in Cleveland, Ohio on ESPN 850 WKNR.

"Come On, Come On"
"Come On, Come On" was featured in a Gap commercial and the films Big Fat Liar, Dude, Where's My Car?, Snow Day, and Deuce Bigalow: Male Gigolo. The song was also used in the episode "Queen Bebe" from the hit television series Kim Possible.

Reception

Astro Lounge has been certified 3× Platinum by the RIAA. Its single, "All Star", peaked at number 4 on the US Billboard Hot 100 in August 1999.

The album received generally positive reviews from critics, with some deeming it superior to the band's debut album.

Track listing

Personnel
Smash Mouth
Steve Harwell – lead vocals
Paul De Lisle – bass, backing vocals
Greg Camp – guitars, backing vocals
Kevin Coleman – drums, percussion
Michael Klooster – keyboards, programming, backing vocals

Additional musicians
Mark Camp – sci-fi stylings (turntables, effects)
John Gove – trombone
Dana Pfeffer – xylophone
Eric Valentine – additional keyboards, vibraphone
DJ Homicide – turntables on "Stoned"

Charts

Weekly charts

Year-end charts

Certifications

References

External links

Astro Lounge at YouTube (streamed copy where licensed)
The Official Smash Mouth site

Smash Mouth albums
1999 albums
Interscope Records albums
Albums produced by Eric Valentine